Lock 'N Load is a six-part, unscripted, hidden-camera American reality television series that premiered on October 21, 2009 on Showtime. It is based at The Shootist gun store in Englewood, Colorado, and focuses on a high volume salesman, Josh T. Ryan, while examining the gun enthusiast lifestyle.

References

External links

2009 American television series debuts
2000s American reality television series
English-language television shows
Showtime (TV network) original programming
Television shows set in Colorado
Television series by Authentic Entertainment
2009 American television series endings